Gun-Shy is a 2003 German crime drama film directed by Dito Tsintsadze.

Plot
The conscientious objector Lukas (Fabian Hinrichs) is a "meals-on-wheels" delivery man and leads a rather sad and lonely life. One day, however, he encounters a strange girl on a bus, Isabella (Lavinia Wilson), who slips him a "Help me!" note. Lukas ends up falling in love with Isabella.

But what he initially considers to be a romantic relationship between her and an older man quickly turns out to be the cause of the message in the tram. He finds out that Isabella's stepfather sexually abused her, even though she tries to forget this. The more pacifist Lukas is experiencing a period of rethinking that ends in the decision to get a gun to protect or save Isabella from her stepfather.

Previously, however, he gets already in the sights of a police investigator, who only wants to clear up the case of a stolen boat, but always visits Lukas, because he sees in him a danger. Through the new acquaintance of an old woman who supplies him, Lukas manages to get a precision rifle, and he begins to practice dealing with it and to mentally prepare himself for the killing, which he actually rejects as a conscientious objector. However he has inhibitions and recoils from the last step back - he is gun-shy.

Isabella's stepfather conducts seminars on anxiety, which Lukas also visits. Thus, he is also present when he dies on the reading stage of a heart attack. Since then Lukas sees and hears nothing more about Isabella. In a mailbox, he leaves her the message that he intended to kill her stepfather, but even on these messages, the distance remains.

Lukas overcomes his fear of shooting as the target has changed.

Cast
Fabian Hinrichs - Lukas Eiserbeck
Lavinia Wilson - Isabella
Johan Leysen - Isabella's stepfather Romberg
Christoph Waltz - Johannsen
Ingeborg Westphal - Sieveking
Axel Prahl - night swimmer
Thorsten Mertens - Krausser

Awards
The film won the Golden Seashell at the San Sebastián International Film Festival in 2003.

References

External links

German crime drama films
2003 crime drama films
2003 films
Films directed by Dito Tsintsadze
2000s German films